The 1995–96 QMJHL season was the 27th season in the history of the Quebec Major Junior Hockey League. The league continued to expand eastward, adding an expansion team in Moncton, New Brunswick, and the Saint-Jean Lynx relocated to the eastern Quebec city of Rimouski in the Bas-Saint-Laurent region. Fourteen teams played 70 games each in the schedule.

The Granby Prédateurs finished first overall in the regular season winning the Jean Rougeau Trophy, and won their 1st President's Cup, defeating the Beauport Harfangs in the finals. The Prédateurs became the first QMJHL team to win the Memorial Cup in 15 years, by defeating the Peterborough Petes in the finals of the 1996 Memorial Cup tournament.

Team changes
 The Moncton Alpines join the league as an expansion franchise, playing in the Dilio Division.
 The Saint-Jean Lynx relocated to Rimouski, Quebec, becoming the Rimouski Océanic, and switch to the Dilio Division.
 The Drummondville Voltigeurs switch to the Lebel Division.
 The Sherbrooke Faucons switch to the Lebel Division.
 The Granby Bisons are renamed the Granby Prédateurs.

Final standings
Note: GP = Games played; W = Wins; L = Losses; T = Ties; Pts = Points; GF = Goals for; GA = Goals against

Complete list of standings.

Scoring leaders
Note: GP = Games played; G = Goals; A = Assists; Pts = Points; PIM = Penalty Minutes

 Complete scoring statistics.

Playoffs
Xavier Delisle was the leading scorer of the playoffs with 40 points (13 goals, 27 assists).

Divisional round-robin
Note: GP = Games played; W = Wins; L = Losses; T = Ties; Pts = Points; GF = Goals for; GA = Goals against

‡ Saint-Hyacinthe Laser defeated Sherbrooke Faucons in a one-game playoff to determine 4th place in the round-robin standings.

Playoffs Bracket

All-star teams
First team
 Goaltender - Frederic Deschenes, Granby Prédateurs
 Left defence - Denis Gauthier, Drummondville Voltigeurs
 Right defence - Stephane Robidas, Shawinigan Cataractes
 Left winger - Daniel Goneau, Granby Prédateurs
 Centreman - Christian Dubé, Sherbrooke Faucons
 Right winger - Frederic Chartier, Beauport Harfangs
 Coach - Jean Pronovost, Shawinigan Cataractes

Second team
 Goaltender - Jose Theodore, Hull Olympiques
 Left defence - Jan Nemecek, Hull Olympiques
 Right defence - DD/RD Francis Bouillon, Granby Prédateurs
 Left winger - Jean-Guy Trudel, Hull Olympiques
 Centreman - Danny Briere, Drummondville Voltigeurs
 Right winger - Xavier Delisle, Granby Prédateurs
 Coach - Robert Mongrain, Hull Olympiques

Rookie team
 Goaltender - Mathieu Garon, Victoriaville Tigres
 Left defence - Mario Larocque, Hull Olympiques
 Right defence - Colin White, Hull Olympiques
 Left winger - Pierre Dagenais, Victoriaville Tigres
 Centreman - Patrick Grandmaitre, Victoriaville Tigres
 Right winger - Pavel Rosa, Hull Olympiques
 Coach - Gaston Therrien, Rimouski Océanic

List of First/Second/Rookie team all-stars.

Trophies and awards
Team
President's Cup - Playoff Champions, Granby Prédateurs
Jean Rougeau Trophy - Regular Season Champions, Granby Prédateurs
Robert Lebel Trophy - Team with best GAA, Granby Prédateurs

Player
Michel Brière Memorial Trophy - Most Valuable Player, Christian Dubé, Sherbrooke Faucons
Jean Béliveau Trophy - Top Scorer, Danny Briere, Drummondville Voltigeurs
Guy Lafleur Trophy - Playoff MVP, Jason Doig, Granby Prédateurs
Ford Cup – Offensive - Offensive Player of the Year, Danny Briere, Drummondville Voltigeurs
Ford Cup – Defensive - Defensive Player of the Year, Christian Laflamme, Beauport Harfangs
AutoPro Plaque - Best plus/minus total, Daniel Goneau, Granby Prédateurs
Jacques Plante Memorial Trophy - Best GAA, Frederic Deschenes, Granby Prédateurs
Emile Bouchard Trophy - Defenceman of the Year, Denis Gauthier, Drummondville Voltigeurs
Mike Bossy Trophy - Best Pro Prospect, Jean-Pierre Dumont, Val-d'Or Foreurs
New Faces Cup - Rookie of the Year, not awarded
Michel Bergeron Trophy - Offensive Rookie of the Year, Pavel Rosa, Hull Olympiques
Raymond Lagacé Trophy - Defensive Rookie of the Year, Mathieu Garon, Victoriaville Tigres
Frank J. Selke Memorial Trophy - Most sportsmanlike player, Christian Dubé, Sherbrooke Faucons
QMJHL Humanitarian of the Year - Humanitarian of the Year, Danny Briere, Drummondville Voltigeurs
Marcel Robert Trophy - Best Scholastic Player, Marc Denis, Chicoutimi Saguenéens
Paul Dumont Trophy - Personality of the Year, Christian Dubé, Sherbrooke Faucons

Executive
Ron Lapointe Trophy - Coach of the Year, Jean Pronovost, Shawinigan Cataractes
John Horman Trophy - Executive of the Year, Andre Jolicoeur, Rimouski Océanic
St-Clair Group Plaque - Marketing Director of the Year, Éric Forest, Rimouski Océanic

See also
1996 Memorial Cup
1996 NHL Entry Draft
1995–96 OHL season
1995–96 WHL season

References
 Official QMJHL website
 www.hockeydb.com/

Quebec Major Junior Hockey League seasons
QMJHL